This page shows the progress of Cheltenham Town in the 2011–12 football season. They played their games in the fourth tier of English football, League Two.

League table

Squad statistics

Appearances and goals

|}

Top scorers

Disciplinary record

Results

Pre-season friendlies

League Two

FA Cup

League Cup

Football League Trophy

Transfers

Awards

References 

Cheltenham Town F.C. seasons
Cheltenham Town